Flustrellidridae is a family of bryozoans belonging to the order Ctenostomatida.

Genera:
 Elzerina Lamouroux, 1816
 Flustrellidra Bassler, 1953
 Flustrellidrella d'Hondt, 1983
 Neobockiella d'Hondt, 1983
 Neoflustrellidra d'Hondt, 1976

References

Bryozoan families